Monster House is a third-person shooter survival horror video game developed by Artificial Mind and Movement and published by THQ. The game is based on the 2006 animated film of the same name. The game was met with mixed reception.

Gameplay 
The game follows the plot of the film, except it introduces many rooms in the house that were unseen in the film. The three main characters D.J., Chowder and Jenny must navigate through the house to reunite with each other and destroy the house. The enemies in the house are living furniture and electronics that act as the house's minions. Obstacles include pipes that can block doors or pathways to keep the player on track, tentacle-like pipes that can harm the player, trees that can try to grab the player, objects that can fly at the player, spotlights from windows that can awaken monsters to attack the player if they're caught, and giant pipe monsters that can suck up the player. The game has about nine chapters that each tell the story from each of the characters' perspective. Bathrooms serve as save points throughout the game and are the safest parts of the house. Players can attack enemies and bosses using their water guns or by counterattacking. Each character also has a special ability that they can use to combat monsters: D.J. can stun enemies with his camera, Jenny can attack enemies and destroy padlocks with her slingshot and Chowder can attack enemies with water balloons. Boxes containing ammo for the secondary attacks can also be used for refill. Additionally, food found around the house can restore health and tokens allow the player to play the game "Thou Art Dead".

Plot
At the beginning, just like in the movie, DJ, Chowder and Jenny are pulled into the home, in the police car. After that, they give a jump to avoid being eaten by the house while the police car is thrown down into the stomach.

However, Chowder and Jenny are pulled away from DJ shortly after, by two giant pipes. DJ finds a key in a chest beneath the stairs and uses it to unlock the door to the kitchen. He sees a burning toaster and quickly puts out the fire. After stepping into the house's spotlight, he fights a living chair and enters a hallway where he sees some living chairs go into a nearby room. After finding a key to the bathroom at the end of the hallway, he fights floor crawlers along the way and a living TV passes from behind him after he walks through a door. He dodges some incoming flying books and goes through the bathroom that leads him back to the foyer where he fights another living chair. Meanwhile, Jenny finds herself in the attic and after jumping across a stack of crates that swift away, she tries to get back by going through the air vents, but she gets trapped by a blockade of pipes.

Chowder finds himself in the greenhouse and after exiting the greenhouse and finding a spare light bulb for his water gun, he fights living chairs and wall lamps before arriving in the kitchen and after defeating numerous floor crawlers, he is attacked by a giant pipe, he narrowly escapes the pipe by falling down a dumbwaiter shaft. DJ meanwhile, enters the family room where the phonograph in the room begins playing music and awakens flying books. He manages to fight them off until the phonograph stops playing, unblocking a door to a hallway that leads him to a room with a player piano in it. The piano suddenly begins to play by itself, awakening two living chairs, one normal and one red that is constantly revived by the piano's music. DJ disables the piano, which weakens the red chair and allows DJ to finish it off. He retrieves a key inside the piano and makes it back to the family room where he uses the key to unlock the door to the library. DJ then searches for a dusty book and uses it to open a secret passageway and enters an air duct that leads him to the basement where he finds a crashed police car (possibly the same one that got thrown down into the house's stomach). He contacts Skull and he tells DJ that in order to get out, they have to kill the house by taking out its heart, which is the furnace. DJ goes into the next room and when he tries to open a door, the knob falls off and lands on the ceiling. He turns on two washing machines to knock a large crate down from a shelf and while he moves it over to a wardrobe to climb up it to reach the doorknob, living chairs and gas tank monsters attack him. He is able to fight them off and retrieve the doorknob. DJ then comes across a door with a unseen fiery field behind it. He find a key inside a jar and uses it to unlock a crest and finds a hook inside it. He enters a large room where blockade of pipes prevent him from going any farther. After moving a crate to an open area of the blockade to block off a section of pipes, he was able to get inside the blocked area and moves another crate under a ladder and uses the hook to bring down the ladder and uses it to get to the second floor. Finding himself back in the foyer on the second floor, DJ tries to open an unblocked door that leads to a bedroom, which suddenly throws him inside and closes. He find a key in a jar and uses it to unlock a nearby door to a sideways bedroom where he finds the missing grate handle to the fireplace back in the other bedroom. He opens the fireplace and puts out the fire, revealing a secret passage that takes him to the attic. While avoiding the house's spotlight, he moves the same pile of crate that Jenny jumped across earlier back to the middle, uncovering an air duct. He moves another large crate under the vent so he can climb up to it. He goes through the vent which takes him to a hallway where he finds a key in a nearby room and uses it to open the door to another room at the end of the hallway and finds Jenny still stuck in the vents.

The room where he finds her turns 180° (upside down) as DJ goes forward and after defeating numerous monsters, He goes over to Jenny, but can't free her. Finding another way, Jenny enters the master bedroom and after hearing a telephone suddenly ring, it stops when she approaches it and while looking at some pictures, a floor crawler comes by, getting her attention as a TV comes to life. Jenny defeats the living TV and encounters the first boss in the next room, a large doll that resembles Constance, Nebbercracker's late wife, which comes to life when the chandelier above falls on it. She fights it by destroying the light bulbs on it and finishes it off by shooting the beam holding it up and grabbing the chandelier chain while open firing her water at it. Following her fight against the doll, she finds a way back to the attic.

In the attic, Jenny finds what appears to be a painting of her and a lamp suddenly comes to life. She defeats the lamp and finds a key in the next room and fights a living stove in another room and uses the key to unlock the door there. A blockade of pipes appear and she sees DJ on the floor below. DJ comes after her, but is eaten by a canopy bed in the master bedroom after defeating many monsters and finding a key on it. Up in the attic, Jenny find a train set powered by a bicycle. Monsters ambush her while she moves the model train, which eventually comes off the track and disappears into a poster, where she find a small tunnel behind it, leading into another room. After defeating two living stoves and three living lamps and after she recovers the missing gear to the dumbwaiter, she uses it to get to the basement.

Meanwhile, having woken up in the bowels of the house after falling down the dumbwaiter, Chowder fights a living TV and enters a flooded room. He climbs up to a platform where he moves a crate to a nearby pipe with a valve and turns it to drain out the water. Chowder then fights off many monsters consisting of gas tanks, floor crawlers, and lamps and encounters the second boss, a large killer pipe. After defeating them all, he moves another crate to a high up platform and finds a key to the nearby door behind some furnaces. After using it to unlock the door, he enters an underground bathroom where a TV passes from behind while he goes through a door. Making his way through the labyrinth, Chowder fights two more living TVs and encounters the third boss, again the giant pipe, but has to defeat it three times before he can make his way to the actual basement.

Having made her way to the basement, Jenny fights two living TVs and another living stove and reunites with DJ. Meanwhile, Chowder must make his way through a maze of toys in another part of the basement.

At the end of the maze, Chowder finds his lost basketball but also finds and defeats the fourth boss, this time, two large pipes instead of one. Chowder enters a circus-themed area where he plays shooting games to find the missing eye and nose of the clown on a merry-go-around to move forward (all while fighting off chairs, floor crawlers, gas tanks, and a TV, which will only come alive if Chowder fails at one of the games) and reunites with DJ and Jenny.

They discover that the house is possessed by Constance. They try to destroy the furnace (the heart of the house), but fail and are separated again by three giant pipes.

The children then fight to escape the house by making their way through the maze of corridors, encountering more enemies along the way. They all then reunite again in the main entrance and narrowly escape the house thanks to Jenny, who pulls down on the house's uvula (chandelier).

After escaping, the house chases them to an abandoned construction site, in which along the way, causes a manhole to pop out of the ground and throws a car at them. Chowder fights off the house, the final boss, with a backhoe.

Then DJ, while hanging from a construction crane, throws an active dynamite down the house`s chimney, destroying the furnace and the house itself. DJ then says one last monologue, then the game's credits roll.

Reception

Monster House received "mixed or average reviews" on all platforms according to the review aggregation website Metacritic. In Japan, where the DS version was ported for release on February 1, 2007, Famitsu gave it a score of one four, one five, and two sixes for a total of 21 out of 40.

References

External links
 
 
 

2006 video games
Action-adventure games
Behaviour Interactive games
Game Boy Advance games
GameCube games
Halloween video games
Horror video games
Multiplayer and single-player video games
Nintendo DS games
PlayStation 2 games
Single-player video games
Sony Pictures video games
Survival video games
THQ games
Video games based on films
Video games developed in Canada
Video games set in Wisconsin
Video games using Havok